Boyce Cedric Mullins II (born October 1, 1994) is an American professional baseball outfielder for the Baltimore Orioles of Major League Baseball (MLB). He made his MLB debut in 2018.

Professional career

Early career
Mullins attended Brookwood High School in Snellville, Georgia, and played college baseball at Louisburg College and Campbell University. He was drafted by the Baltimore Orioles in the 13th round of the 2015 Major League Baseball Draft.

Mullins made his professional debut with the Low-A Aberdeen IronBirds in 2015, spending the whole season there, posting a .264 batting average with two home runs and 32 RBIs in 68 games. He played 2016 with the Single-A Delmarva Shorebirds, batting .273 with 14 home runs, 55 RBIs, and 30 stolen bases in 124 games, and spent 2017 with the Double-A Bowie Baysox, where he batted .265 with 13 home runs, 37 RBIs, and a .778 OPS in 76 games. He began 2018 with Bowie and was promoted to the Triple-A Norfolk Tides during the season.

2018
Mullins was promoted to the major leagues on August 10, 2018, and he made his major league debut that same night, collecting three hits, two RBI, drawing a walk and scoring three runs in a 19-12 loss to the Boston Red Sox. He became the first Oriole in franchise history to collect three hits in his Major League debut and became only the fifth player in MLB history to score three or more runs and collect two or more extra-base hits in his debut, joining Joey Gallo, J. P. Arencibia, Craig Wilson and Hall of Famer Willie McCovey. Mullins finished the season with a .235 batting average and four home runs in 45 games played.

2019

Mullins began the 2019 season as the Orioles starting center fielder. After struggling to start the season, Mullins was demoted to Triple-A Norfolk on April 22. Mullins continued to struggle in Norfolk and was demoted to Double-A Bowie on July 10, though Orioles manager Brandon Hyde said the organization still felt "really highly about Cedric and his ability." He would play in Double-A for the remainder of the season.

Mullins ended his season hitting .094 in 64 at bats for Baltimore.

2020
Despite his lost season in 2019, Mullins was able to play his way onto Baltimore's opening day roster in 2020 with a strong camp. In 2020 for the Orioles, Mullins hit for .271/.315/.407 with 3 home runs, 12 RBI, and 7 stolen bases. He disclosed on February 2, 2022 that he was diagnosed with Crohn’s disease, and had 10 to 15 centimeters of intestine removed in November 2020 after playing the entire campaign with chronic abdominal pain.

2021
In February 2021, the Orioles announced Mullins would give up switch-hitting and become a full-time left-handed hitter. Mullins first approached the Orioles with the idea in the spring of 2019 but the team opposed it. Before 2021, he had slashed .251/.305/.394 while batting left-handed and .147/.250/.189 from the right side. On April 26, 2021, Mullins had his first career multi-home run game, with two homers against the New York Yankees. From June 4 through June 6, Mullins collected 9 hits in as many at bats including 3 home runs. On July 4, Mullins was named an All-Star for the first time in his career. On July 12, he was chosen to be the starting center fielder in the 2021 All-Star Game, as a replacement for the injured Mike Trout.

On September 24, Mullins became the first Orioles player to hit 30 home runs and steal 30 bases in a season since the franchise moved from St. Louis. For the 2021 season, Mullins slashed .291/.360/.518 with thirty home runs, 59 RBIs, 37 doubles, and thirty stolen bases, and led all major league outfielders with 389 putouts. He was unanimously voted the winner of the 2021 Louis M. Hatter Most Valuable Oriole Award by members of the local media. Mullins finished ninth in the American League MVP balloting. On November 11, 2021, Mullins received his first Silver Slugger Award.

2022
On April 12, 2022, Mullins hit his first career grand slam off of Milwaukee Brewers starting pitcher Eric Lauer. Mullins continued to perform well in his 2022 season, ending with a batting average of .258/.318/.721, 16 homeruns, 64 RBIs, and 34 stolen bases.

On January 13, 2023, Mullins agreed to a one-year, $4.1 million contract with the Orioles for the 2023 season, avoiding salary arbitration.

International career
On August 21, 2022, Mullins announced that he would join the United States national baseball team in the 2023 World Baseball Classic.

Personal life
Mullins is a fan of anime, with Naruto serving as an inspiration for him in his childhood and professional career.

References

External links

Campbell Fight Camels bio

1994 births
Living people
21st-century African-American sportspeople
Aberdeen IronBirds players
African-American baseball players
American League All-Stars
Baltimore Orioles players
Baseball players from Greensboro, North Carolina
Bowie Baysox players
Campbell Fighting Camels baseball players
Delmarva Shorebirds players
Louisburg Hurricanes baseball players
Major League Baseball outfielders
Norfolk Tides players
Silver Slugger Award winners
2023 World Baseball Classic players